Skeleton Warriors is a beat 'em up platform game developed by Neversoft and published by Playmates Interactive for the PlayStation and Sega Saturn. It is based on the animated television series of the same name.

Gameplay
Skeleton Warriors uses 2-dimensional side-scrolling gameplay that combines both beat 'em up and platforming elements, along with occasional hovering motorcycle driving levels. The game uses a mix of pre-rendered sprites with polygonal backgrounds, and fully 3D rendered graphics.

Reception
Next Generation reviewed the Saturn version of the game, rating it three stars out of five, and stated that "in the end, if you simply can't get enough of side-scrolling action games, then you can count on this being one of the best".

IGN rated the PlayStation version 5/10.

Reviews
GameFan #38 (vol. 4, issue 2) - February 1996
GamePro - April 1996
Video Games & Computer Entertainment - March 1996
Game Revolution - June 06, 2004
NowGamer - September 01, 1996
IGN - November 25, 1996
All Game Guide - 1998

References

External links
 Skeleton Warriors at GameFAQs
 Skeleton Warriors at Giant Bomb
 Skeleton Warriors at MobyGames

1996 video games
Dark fantasy video games
Hack and slash games
Motorcycle video games
Neversoft games
PlayStation (console) games
Science fantasy video games
Sega Saturn games
Side-scrolling beat 'em ups
Side-scrolling platform games
Single-player video games
Superhero video games
Video games about curses
Video games about skeletons
Video games based on animated television series
Video games developed in the United States
Video games set on fictional planets
Video games with 2.5D graphics
Video games with digitized sprites
Video games with pre-rendered 3D graphics